Craig Peter James (born 15 November 1982) is an English former footballer who played as a defender.

James started his career with Sunderland in 2002. Following loan spells at Hibernian and Darlington he moved on to Port Vale two years later. James transferred to Darlington permanently in 2006, but was loaned out to York City the following year, before signing with Livingston. After a season with Livingston he joined Barrow, without making an appearance. He returned to the game with non-league Harrogate Town in 2009, where he stayed for two years.

Career
James started his career with Sunderland. He was signed by Scottish Premier League side Hibernian on a year-long loan in August 2002. He was forced to return to Sunderland because of a knee injury in April 2003. He joined Darlington on a month-long loan in November 2003, which was later extended for a second month.

He was signed by Martin Foyle's Port Vale on a one-month loan in March 2004. The next month James was signed by Vale on a two-year permanent contract; as the previous loan deal was agreed before the transfer deadline, the deal could be made permanent. He made a total of 33 appearances for the club in his first full season at the club. In his second season at Vale Park he made a total of 42 appearances, but was released by the club at the end of his contract.

James was re-signed by Darlington in August 2006. He signed for York City of the Conference National on loan for the rest of the 2006–07 season in March 2007, and was an ever-present in the team's starting line-up. In May 2007 he was released by Darlington, and was not offered a contract at York.

He signed for Scottish First Division side Livingston on a one-year contract in August 2007, after a successful trial period with the club. He was released at the end of his contract in May 2008. He signed for Conference Premier team Barrow on a one-month contract in September. He had a trial with former club Darlington in July 2009, but he was not offered a contract after failing to impress.

James's next club would be Conference North side Harrogate Town. His debut for Town came on 31 October 2009 against Redditch United. His first goal for the club arrived against Gainsborough Trinity in a 2–0 win on 13 February 2010.

James was released from Harrogate in May 2011 after his contract was not renewed for the new season.

Career statistics

References

External links

1982 births
Living people
Footballers from Middlesbrough
English footballers
Association football defenders
Sunderland A.F.C. players
Hibernian F.C. players
Darlington F.C. players
Port Vale F.C. players
York City F.C. players
Livingston F.C. players
Barrow A.F.C. players
Harrogate Town A.F.C. players
English Football League players
National League (English football) players
Scottish Premier League players
Scottish Football League players